Rade Mojović (born 1 July 1970) is a Serbian former football goalkeeper.

Club career
During his career he has played for Serbian clubs FK Javor Ivanjica, FK Partizan, FK Obilić, Red Star Belgrade, Slovenian NK Beltinci, and Belgian clubs RE Mouscron, Royal Antwerp, Eendracht Aalst, RFC Athois and Francs Borains.

Honours
Partizan
 First League of FR Yugoslavia Champion: 1992–93
 Yugoslav Cup Winner : 1991–92
Red Star Belgrade
 First League of FR Yugoslavia Champion: 1994–95
 Yugoslav Cup Winner : 1994–95

External links
 Profile at Excelweb
 
 Stats from Slovenia at PrvaLiga.si
 Profile - FC Antwerp

Living people
1970 births
Serbian footballers
Serbian expatriate footballers
FK Javor Ivanjica players
FK Partizan players
FK Obilić players
Red Star Belgrade footballers
NK Beltinci players
Expatriate footballers in Slovenia
Expatriate footballers in Belgium
Royal Excel Mouscron players
Royal Antwerp F.C. players
Belgian Pro League players
Association football goalkeepers
Francs Borains players